Koptothrips is a genus of thrips in the family Phlaeothripidae, first described by Richard Siddoway Bagnall in 1929.

Species in this genus  are kleptoparasites, that is they steal galls made by thrips in the  Kladothrips genus on Acacia phyllodes. They kill the Kladothrips adults but feed on the gall.

Species
There are just four species in this genus, all of which are found in Australia, in all mainland states and territories.
 Koptothrips dyskritus
 Koptothrips flavicornis
 Koptothrips xenus
 Koptothrips zelus

References

External links
Description of Kladothrips from 

Phlaeothripidae
Thrips genera
Taxa named by Richard Siddoway Bagnall
Taxa described in 1929